Over the Rhine is an American, Ohio-based folk music band, the core of which is the husband-and-wife team of pianist/guitarist/bassist Linford Detweiler and vocalist/guitarist Karin Bergquist. The band began as a quartet with guitarist Ric Hordinski and drummer Brian Kelley. Hordinski left the band in December 1996, and Kelley continued to play into 1997 before departing. The original foursome reunited in December 2008 at The Taft Theatre (in Cincinnati) to celebrate the 20th Anniversary of the formation of the band, and again in the summer of 2010 at Ric's studio, "the Monastery", to play the album Good Dog Bad Dog live, in its entirety.

The band's namesake and place of origin is the Cincinnati, Ohio neighborhood Over-the-Rhine. Karin attended school in Barnesville, Ohio and graduated from Barnesville High School in 1984. She then went to Malone University, located in Canton, Ohio, where she met Linford. Karin and Linford were married in the fall of 1996 in Cincinnati and several years ago relocated to a pre-Civil War farmhouse, which they named "The Nowhere Farm", near Martinsville, Ohio.

Over the Rhine is now primarily Bergquist (vocals, acoustic guitar, piano) and Detweiler (keyboards, electric bass, vocals) accompanied by complementary musicians on albums and tours. Over the years, they have toured and recorded in many variations.  They have shared the stage with Bob Dylan, John Prine, Adrian Belew, Squeeze, Ani DiFranco, My Morning Jacket, Hem, and toured as "adjunct" members of Cowboy Junkies.

History
Formed in the spring of 1989, at a time when Detweiler, Hordinski, and Kelley were also touring as part of the final incarnation of Servant, Over the Rhine released independently their first two albums, Till We Have Faces, in 1991 (named for the C. S. Lewis book of the same title) and Patience in 1992, before eventually signing with label giant I.R.S. Records later in 1992. IRS acquired both Till We Have Faces and Patience, issuing them as the first two releases from the band, and later in 1994 would fully fund the band's third LP release Eve to rave reviews. When I.R.S. records was bought out in 1996, Over the Rhine was released from their five-album contract and went on to independently release Good Dog, Bad Dog and The Darkest Night of the Year, both of which outsold the three previous IRS releases combined. In 2001, Over the Rhine signed with Virgin Records/Back Porch and released Films for Radio to near universal acclaim before releasing double album Ohio in 2003.  Paste magazine granted one of its first five-star reviews to Ohio, released on Virgin Records' Back Porch Records label.  Over the Rhine's next album, Drunkard's Prayer, was released on March 29, 2005.

A limited edition live album titled Live From Nowhere, Volume 1 was released in April 2006.  A second limited edition live album, Live From Nowhere, Volume 2 was released in March 2007, just over a month from Discount Fireworks. The Trumpet Child and the "Live From Nowhere" series have been released on their own independent label, Great Speckled Dog (named after their Great Dane, Elroy).

Linford has also recorded and released three solo projects composed of home-recorded acoustic, piano-based music.

In January 2008, Paste'''s video podcast interviewed Over the Rhine and featured a live performance.Paste named Over the Rhine's The Long Surrender one of the Top 50 Best Records of the year.

Over the Rhine's album The Long Surrender was released nationally on February 8, 2011, on the band's own Great Speckled Dog label. It was recorded in California with producer Joe Henry, and contains a duet with Lucinda Williams on "Undamned" and two songs co-written with Joe Henry.

Over the Rhine's album Meet Me at the Edge of the World is a double album that was produced by Joe Henry. The songs were recorded in two sessions at The Garfield House in South Pasadena in 2013: disc one, Sacred Ground, March 28–30 and disc two, Blue Jean Sky, April 1–3.  Aimee Mann appears as a special guest vocalist on the song "Don't Let The Bastards Get You Down". The album was released nationally on September 3, 2013.

On March 15, 2019, Over The Rhine released Love & Revelation, on their own Great Speckled Dog Record label. The album was produced by the band and recorded and mixed by Ryan Freeland. The first single from the album, the title track, was premiered by Paste almost two months earlier. The album premiered on Rolling Stone along with a brief article about the album and the duo's creative process. The album was met with critical acclaim from sources including No Depression and Associated Press, who wrote "Love & Revelation is a subdued but lovely celebration...It won't surprise longtime fans that the topics are often sad and the tempos mostly slow, all the better to showcase Bergquist's warm, wise, honest alto. She sounds better than ever, with a depth and richness that makes her voice resonate like a prayer."

Cincinnati Pops Orchestra featured Over the Rhine in their special July 4 livestream alongside Melinda Doolittle.

Nowhere Else Festival

On Memorial Day weekend of 2016, Over the Rhine hosted and curated the first "Nowhere Else Festival" on their farmland outside of Cincinnati, Ohio. The festival has been an annual event on the same weekend each year until COVID-19 forced the festival to take a hiatus for the 2020 edition. For 2021, again due to the pandemic, the festival was moved to Labor Day weekend.  In 2022, OtR announced the move to September was permanent.

 Discography 
 Studio albums 

1991 - Till We Have Faces (Scampering Songs)
1992 - Patience (Scampering Songs)
1992 - Patience (I.R.S./EMI Records re-issue; different track order)
1994 - Eve (I.R.S./EMI Records)
1995 - Till We Have Faces (I.R.S./EMI Records re-issue; different track listing)
1996 - Good Dog Bad Dog: The Home Recordings (Imaginary Records)
1996 - The Darkest Night of the Year (Imaginary Records; holiday album)
2000 - Good Dog Bad Dog: The Home Recordings (Back Porch/Narada/Virgin/EMI Records re-issue; different track listing)
2001 - Films for Radio (Back Porch/Narada/Virgin/EMI Records)
2003 - Ohio (Back Porch/Narada/Virgin/EMI Records; double album)
2005 - Drunkard's Prayer (Back Porch/Narada/Virgin/EMI Records)
2006 - Snow Angels (Great Speckled Dog, holiday album)
2007 - The Trumpet Child (Great Speckled Dog)
2008 - Good Dog Bad Dog: The Home Recordings (Great Speckled Dog re-issue; different track listing with additional tracks)
2008 - The Darkest Night of the Year (Great Speckled Dog re-issue; holiday album)
2011 - The Long Surrender (Great Speckled Dog)
 2013 - Meet Me at the Edge of the World (Great Speckled Dog)
2014 - Blood Oranges in the Snow (Great Speckled Dog, holiday album))
2019 - Love & Revelation (Great Speckled Dog)

 Live albums 

1999 - Amateur Shortwave Radio (Grey Ghost Records) compiled by Linford Detweiler to mark the 10th anniversary of the band's first recordings in 1989.
2004 - Changes Come: Over the Rhine Live2006 - Live From Nowhere, Volume 1 (limited edition run of 3,000)
2007 - Live From Nowhere, Volume 2 (limited edition run of 5,000)
 CD copies of Live From Nowhere Volumes 1 and 2 are out of print and only available via iTunes Store.
2008 - Live From Nowhere, Volume 3 (limited edition run)
2009 - Live From Nowhere, Volume 4 (limited edition run)
2010 - Good Dog Bad Dog Live (Website Exclusive)
2015 - Barn Raising Live (Website Exclusive)

 Compilations 

1997 - Besides (Imaginary Records; demos, alternate takes, mixes, and unreleased material from 1991 to 1997)
2000 - Roaring Lambs (Squint Entertainment) Over the Rhine contributed the song "Goodbye" for this compilation album.
2002 - The Cutting Room Floor (demos, outtakes and other material from the Films For Radio era)
2002 - "Hidden Treasures: Cincinnati's Tribute to King Records' Legacy" Over the Rhine contributed the song "Fever" for this compilation album.
2006 - The Message: Psalms Over the Rhine contributed the song "Flown Free" based on Psalm 124 & Psalm 129 for this compilation album.
2007 - Discount Fireworks (Back Porch Records; career-spanning compilation plus one unreleased song)
2007 - "For The Kids Three" Over the Rhine contributed an original tune titled "Poopsmith Song" for this compilation.
2009 - Notes from the Monastery (Over the Rhine contributed the cover of "Hard Times (Come Again No More)" and a new version of "Flown Free" which was a digital only bonus track)
2011 -"Paint it Black: An Alt-Country Tribute to the Rolling Stones" Over the Rhine contributed the Rolling Stones cover "Waiting On a Friend"

 Special releases 

1994 - Serpents and Gloves (VHS-only video/documentary release; IRS Records)
2006 - Snow Angels (Karin's Acoustic Sketches) (digital-only bonus)
2010 - "OTR 2010 Demos" (A digital gift of 12 demos given to those fans who pre-ordered/funded The Long Surrender "Let's Make a Record")
2012 - "OtR 2012 Demos" (A digital gift of 12 demos given to those fans who pre-ordered/funded The Farm "Let's Make a Record" which became Meet Me At The Edge Of The World)
2013 - Five Good Reasons To Meet Me (Noisetrade.com Exclusive compilation of tracks from "Meet Me At The Edge Of The World".)
2014 - "Even The Snow Turns Blue" (An Over the Rhine Christmas compilation, Digital only download for Noisetrade.com featuring selections from all three holiday records by the band.)

 Solo albums by Linford Detweiler 

1999 - Solo Piano: I Don't Think There's No Need to Bring Nothin' (Music for First Kind Sight) (What Reindeer and Grey Ghost Records)
2001 - Grey Ghost Stories (Grey Ghost Records)
2004 - Unspoken Requests (Grey Ghost Records)

 Albums by Ric Hordinski, solo and as Monk 

1997 - Quiver1998 - Hush1999 - Blink2000 - "O" (EP)
2001 - How Like a Winter (holiday album)
2003 - When I Consider How My Light Is Spent (as Ric Hordinski)
2005 - 12/05 (EP, CDR)
2007 - The Silence of Everything Yearned For2009 - Notes from the Monastery'' (various artists produced by Hordinski)

References

External links
 
 

I.R.S. Records artists
Married couples
Musical groups from Cincinnati